Podiates (Cavalier-Smith, 2012, excl. Ancyromonadida) are a proposed clade containing the Amorphea (incl. Opisthokonta, Amoebozoa, apusomonads and breviates) and the organisms now assigned to the clade CRuMs. Ancyromonadida does not appear to have emerged in this grouping.
Sarcomastigota (Cavalier-Smith, 1983) is a proposed subkingdom (currently shown to be paraphyletic) that includes all the podiates that are not animals or fungi. 
Sulcozoa (Cavalier-Smith, 2012) is a proposed phylum (currently shown to be paraphyletic) within Sarcomastigota that does not include the phyla Amoebozoa (clade) and Choanozoa (paraphyletic), i.e. it includes the proposed subphyla Apusozoa and Varisulca

References

 
Eukaryote unranked clades